Popular figures of India have often been conferred with an honorific title by fans and followers. These generally include those that are not formally recognised. Many titles were given to various Indian leaders during Indian independence struggle.

List

References 

Indian politicians
20th-century Indian philosophers
Indian people